Florence Allen (born 13 August 1999) is an English former footballer who played in the defender position for Bristol City. She has represented England on the under-17 national team. She is currently the General Manager of Norwich City Women.

Early life
Allen was raised on her family's farm in Norfolk and began playing football at the age of 6. At the age of 16, she moved to Bristol to pursue her dream of becoming a professional footballer.

Playing career

Bristol City, 2016–2022 
Allen signed with Bristol City in January 2016 ahead of the 2016 FA WSL season. She made 11 appearances for the team and helped secure a second-place result with a  record and promotion to FA WSL 1. Allen was sidelined during the 2018–19 season due to a long term hip injury. Allen announced her retirement from professional football in April 2022.

International 
Allen has represented England on the under-15 and under-17 national teams. She was named to the England squad for the 2016 FIFA U-17 Women's World Cup in September 2016.

Honours 
 with Bristol City.
 FA WSL 2 Runner-up: 2015

See also

References

Further reading
 Caudwell, Jayne (2011), Women's Football in the UK: Continuing with Gender Analyses, Routledge, 
 Grainey, Timothy (2012), Beyond Bend It Like Beckham: The Global Phenomenon of Women's Soccer, University of Nebraska Press, 
 Scraton, S., Magee, J., Caudwell, J. (2008), Women, Football and Europe: Histories, Equity and Experience (Ifi) (Vol 1), Meyer & Meyer Fachverlag und Buchhandel GmbH, 
 Stewart, Barbara (2012), Women's Soccer: The Passionate Game, Greystone Books, 
 Williams, Jean (2003), A Game for Rough Girls?: A History of Women's Football in Britain, Routledge,

External links 
 
 
 Bristol City player profile
 
 

1999 births
Living people
Women's Super League players
Bristol Academy W.F.C. players
English women's footballers
Women's association football defenders
Women's association football midfielders